Sarhanger or Sarhangar may refer to:
 Sarhangar, Jiroft
 Sarhanger, Rabor